Squatting in Namibia is the occupation of unused land or derelict buildings without the permission of the owner. During the chaos of World War I, Khoisan and Bantu peoples squatted vacant land and farms. After Namibian independence in 1990, squatting increased as people migrated to the cities. Land reform became one of the biggest goals for those who had participated in the liberation struggle. By 2020, 401,748 people were living in 113 informal settlements across the country. Squatting continues to be regulated by the Squatters Proclamation of 1985; a challenge to this law was dismissed by the High Court in 2023.

History

Colonial times
In pre-colonial times there was no notion of formal land ownership in South West Africa, and thus the concept of squatting thus did not apply. The dispossession of land from Africans by European settlers began in the nineteenth century with the coming of the German Empire and the area was incorporated as German South West Africa. In 1915, South Africa occupied the colony, ruling it until 1990 as South West Africa. During the chaos of World War I, Khoisan and Bantu peoples squatted vacant land and farms; to do this was subsequently made illegal and the squatters were forcibly resettled. By 1926, 7.5 million hectares had been allotted to 1,106 white farmers. Afterwards, South Africa imposed the apartheid system which gave land to white farmers and dispossessed black Namibians of ancestral lands, with the 1962 Commission of Enquiry into South West Africa Affairs continuing to enforce apartheid. Namibia was divided along ethnic lines: ten bantustans were established, the remaining territory, including much of the agriculturally viable land, was reserved for Whites.

Post-independence

When Namibia gained independence in March 1990, the country inherited a division of land in which 3,500 farmers, who were almost entirely Whites, owned approximately 50 per cent of the country's agricultural land. These farmers constituted 0.2 per cent of the total national population. Land reform became one of the biggest goals for many who participated in Namibia's liberation struggle. At the same time the settlements began to grow; in the twenty-first century, squatting in Namibia most often occurs when poor migrant from the rural north move to the capital Windhoek and live in informal settlements. Squatters in the Vergenoeg shanty town on the edge of Okahandja were told in 2019 they had to move so as to allow construction of a new highway between Okahandja and Windhoek. Five thousand people were affected.

Government plans to upgrade settlements have been criticised by squatters who either have been moved to a temporary site then not resettled or have not received promised improvements.
In Havana in Windhoek, there were many cases of Hepatitis E in 2018. During the COVID-19 pandemic, squatters in Outjo voiced concern about finding food and firewood during lockdown. 

In 2020, the Harambee Prosperity Plan 2 was released. It declared that 401,748 people were living in 113 informal settlements across the country. Almost 100,000 of these people lived in Windhoek, 76,068 in Rundu, 52,870 in Otjiwarongo, 35,452 in Oshakati, over 24,000 in Swakopmund and Walvis Bay, over 13,000 in Rehoboth, 11,400 in Tsumeb, 8,670 in Nkurenkuru and  8,090 at Gobabis.

Legal 
Squatting continues to be regulated by the Squatters Proclamation, AG 21 of 1985. Certain sections were struck out as unconstitutional following Shaanika and Others v Windhoek City Police and Others in 2013. Dimbulukeni Nauyoma, a land activist, launched a challenge to the proclamation in 2020, claiming it was entirely unconstitutional. Nauyoma had been arrested the previous year for resisting an eviction in Windhoek. In 2023, the High Court dismissed the challenge, saying it had not been specified which part of the proclamation were violating human rights. Nauyoma's lawyers said they would appeal to the Supreme Court.

See also  

 Flexible Land Tenure System (Namibia)
 Poverty in Namibia

References 

Squatting in Namibia
History of Namibia